Castlederg (earlier Caslanadergy) is a town in County Tyrone, Northern Ireland. It lies on the River Derg and is near the border with County Donegal, Ireland. It stands in the townlands of Castlesessagh and Churchtown, in the historic barony of Omagh West and the civil parish of Urney. The village has a ruined castle and two ancient tombs known as the Druid's Altar and Todd's Den. It had a population of 2,976 people at the 2011 Census.

The village hosts some of the district's key events each year, including the Derg Vintage Rally, Dergfest music festival, Red River Festival and the traditional Apple Fair.

Castlederg was a traveller's stop along the ancient pilgrimage route to Station Island on Lough Derg. The town boasts ancient ruins and monastic settlements.

History

Early history
Historically the area around the town was a site of contestation between the territories of Cenél nEógain (later Tír Eoghain) and Connail (later Tír Chonaill - mostly modern County Donegal). This rivalry between the two powers continued until the 16th century when they combined in the defence of Ulster against the encroaching Elizabethan armies.  The Castlederg area, lying within the new barony of Omagh, was granted to the English Attorney-General for Ireland, Sir John Davies. Two castles were constructed on his proportion, Castle Curlews (Kirlish Castle) outside Drumquin and the bulk of what can be seen today on the northern bank of the Derg at Castlederg. A bronze-age cauldron was found at Castlederg in 2011.

The Troubles
During the Troubles, 25 people were killed in and around Castlederg (including Killeter and Killen) and there were many bombings in the village. The Provisional Irish Republican Army (IRA) killed 11 members of the Ulster Defence Regiment and Royal Ulster Constabulary, four fellow IRA members whom it accused of being informers, and three Ulster Protestant civilians. Four IRA members were also killed when their bombs exploded prematurely. Ulster loyalist paramilitaries killed three Catholic civilians. For more information, see The Troubles in Castlederg.

Transport
The narrow-gauge Castlederg and Victoria Bridge Tramway was built in 1883, to link the village with the Great Northern Railway (Ireland) at Victoria Bridge. Castlederg railway station opened on 4 July 1884, but was finally closed on 17 April 1933.

Demography

19th century population
The population of the village increased during the 19th century:

21st century population
Castlederg is classified as an intermediate settlement by the Northern Ireland Statistics and Research Agency (NISRA) (i.e. with a population between 2,500 and 4,999 people).
On Census Day (27 March 2011) the usually resident population of Castlederg Settlement was 2,976, accounting for 0.16% of the NI total. Of these:
 19.72% were under 16 years old and 16.97% were aged 65 and above;
 48.42% of the population were male and 51.58% were female; and
 58.67% were from a Catholic community background and 40.22% were from a 'Protestant and Other Christian (including Christian related)' community background.
 36.56% indicated that they had a British national identity, 34.54% had an Irish national identity, and 30.51% had a Northern Irish national identity.

Climate

2010 and 2021 temperature records
On the 22 July, Armagh reported  which has since been rejected by the UK Met Office, meaning Castlederg holds both the highest and lowest temperature records in Northern Ireland.

Governance
The town is one of the electoral wards in the Derg district electoral area of Derry City and Strabane District Council. The other wards are Finn, Glenderg, Newtownstewart and Sion Mills. Below are the results of the 2019 Derry City and Strabane District Council election

Derg

2014: 3 x Sinn Féin, 1 x DUP, 1 x UUP
2019: 2 x Sinn Féin, 1 x DUP, 1 x UUP, 1 x SDLP
2014-2019 change: SDLP gain one seat from Sinn Féin

Education

Primary
Edwards Primary School - Established 1938 
Erganagh Primary school-closed
Gaelscoil na Deirge 
Killen Primary School - Established 1935 
Saint Francis Of Assisi Primary School, Drumnabey, Castlederg
Saint Patrick's Primary School - Established in 1973

Secondary
Castlederg High School Established 1958
St Eugene's High School-1961 to 2013

Sport

Football
Dergview F.C.

Gaelic games
Castlederg St. Eugene's

Notable residents
 Conor Bradley, Liverpool and Northern Ireland full-back, grew up in Castlederg. 
James Harper (1780–1873), U.S. Congressman, born in Castlederg

References

Sources
 NI Conflict Archive on the Internet
 Cycle Northwest
 Strabane District Council
 NISRA

External links 

Welcome to Castlederg 

Villages in County Tyrone
Civil parish of Urney